A Shaun the Sheep Movie: Farmageddon is a 2019 stop-motion animated science fiction comedy film produced by Aardman Animations. The film is directed by Richard Phelan and Will Becher (in their feature directorial debuts) and written by Mark Burton and Jon Brown, based on an idea by Richard Starzak. It is a stand-alone sequel to Shaun the Sheep Movie (2015) and is based on the claymation television series Shaun the Sheep, a spinoff from the Wallace and Gromit short film A Close Shave. It is the first sequel ever made by Aardman and in stop-motion in general. The film stars Justin Fletcher, John Sparkes, Kate Harbour, and Rich Webber reprising their voice roles from the series and the previous film, whilst new cast members include Amalia Vitale, David Holt and Chris Morrell. In the film, Shaun and the flock encounter a cute alien with extraordinary powers, who crash-lands near Mossy Bottom Farm. They have to find a way to return her home in order to prevent her falling into the hands of the Ministry for Alien Detection.

Plans for a sequel began in 2015, following the release of the first film. The film officially began production following the end of production of Early Man (2018). Richard Starzak was announced to return as director, however, in November 2018, the film was later announced to be directed by Becher and Phelan.

A Shaun the Sheep Movie: Farmageddon was released in cinemas on 18 October 2019 in the United Kingdom, and on Netflix in the United States on 14 February 2020. The film received generally positive reviews from critics, praising its animation, humour and charm and grossed $43.1 million against a $25 million budget. It was nominated at the British Academy Film Awards for Best Animated Film and at the Academy Awards for Best Animated Feature Film, losing to Klaus and Soul, respectively.

Plot 
In the town of Mossingham, Farmer John and his dog, Bingo, discover the landing of a UFO. On nearby Mossy Bottom Farm, Shaun and the flock attempt to pass time with several dangerous activities, only for Bitzer to stop them. After being banned from having a barbecue for dinner, Shaun decides to order three pizzas, but when the pizzas arrive, both Bitzer—who intercepts two-thirds of the delivery—and the flock discover the pizza boxes are completely empty.

The next morning, Shaun discovers a trail of pizza crusts and encounters the visitor. The visitor introduces herself as Lu-La, an impish alien from the planet To-Pa who can mimic sounds and levitate objects. When Shaun introduces her to the flock, she causes mischief with a combine harvester, damaging it while transforming a field behind the farm house into unintentional crop circles. Taking advantage of the recent news of alien sightings, the Farmer deduces he can create an alien-based theme park, "Farmageddon", in which he can earn money to afford a new harvester.

The Ministry of Alien Detection's (M.A.D.) leader, Agent Red, who has been obsessed with proving the existence of aliens since seeing two of them as a child, investigates the UFO claims. Meanwhile, Lu-La and Shaun track down the UFO, followed by Bitzer, who spots them while posting flyers for "Farmageddon" in an alien costume. On board the UFO, Lu-La transmits her memories to Shaun, revealing that she is actually a child and accidentally launched her parents' spaceship while playing on it. They realise they need an egg-shaped sphere device, dropped by Lu-La when leaving the UFO, to activate it. M.A.D. mistakes Bitzer for an alien and follows him to the UFO, capturing it with Shaun, Lu-La, and Bitzer still on board. They also find the device and take both it and the UFO back to their secret base.

At the base, Shaun and Lu-La slip out and manage to retrieve the device, successfully restarting the ship and escaping the base. They set a course for To-Pa; en route, Shaun ignores Bitzer's instructions not to press the ship's buttons and causes it to crash-land back at the farm. With the UFO destroyed, Lu-La is left heartbroken. Feeling guilty, Shaun discovers that the device can be used to send a distress signal if he reaches a high enough point. Shaun suggests that he and Lu-La attempt to reach the top of the Farmer's "Farmageddon" theme park tower to make contact.

With the help of the flock and Bitzer, Shaun and Lu-La climb the tower while the Farmer launches a show at the theme park. Meanwhile, Red arrives and chases Shaun and Lu-La up the tower with a mecha. Shaun manages to knock Red off the tower and successfully sends a distress signal to To-Pa. Lu-La's parents, Ub-Do and Me-Ma, quickly arrive and reunite with their daughter. Red eventually welcomes the aliens, recognizing them as the aliens she saw as a child. Shaun, Bitzer and the flock bid the aliens farewell, while the "Farmageddon" theme park and show receive rave reviews as the entire incident is regarded as part of the show's special effects. On their way back to To-Pa, the aliens discover the Farmer has accidentally boarded their UFO, prompting them to take him back to Earth.

In a mid-credits scene, Shaun, Bitzer, and the flock play with a frisbee, while the Farmer tries out his new harvester; the frisbee gets caught in the harvester's machinery and causes it to explode.

In a post-credits scene, One of the hazmat-suited M.A.D. agents enters a black room with a keyboard. He then removes his suit and reveals himself to be Professor Brian Cox. He proceeds to play "Things Can Only Get Better" on the keyboard, only to be interrupted by Timmy, who unplugs the keyboard.

Cast
 Justin Fletcher as:
 Shaun, the leader of the flock
 Timmy, Shaun's cousin and the smallest sheep of the flock.
 John Sparkes as:
 Bitzer, the sheepdog of the farm and Shaun's good friend.
 The Farmer, the owner of the farm.
 Amalia Vitale as:
 Lu-la, a mischievous female alien who befriends Shaun.
 Me-Ma, Lu-La's mother.
 Kate Harbour as:
 Timmy's Mum, Timmy's mother and Shaun's aunt.
 Agent Red, the leader of the hazmats who is determined to track down the aliens to prove their existence.
 David Holt as M-U-G-G-1N5 (Muggins), a robot probe and Agent Red's worker.
 Richard Webber as:
 Big Shirley, a fat sheep.
 Obo, Lu-la's father.
 Simon Greenall as The Twins, two sheep of the flock.
 Emma Tate as Hazel, a member of the flock.
 Andy Nyman as Nuts, a sheep with strange eyes.
 Chris Morrell as Farmer John.
 Joe Sugg as Pizza Boy

Production
On 14 September 2015, StudioCanal announced it was working with Aardman on a sequel to Shaun the Sheep Movie. On 25 October 2016, under the working title, Shaun the Sheep Movie 2, Aardman confirmed a sequel would go into pre-production in January 2017 with Richard Starzak, co-director of the first film, returning.

In November 2018, it was announced that Aardman employees Richard Phelan and Will Becher would be co-directing the film, with Starzak still attached as director, due to Peter Lord and David Sproxton giving majority ownership of the company to employees to keep it independent. However, Phelan and Becher ended up being the directors of the final cut, while Starzak received both an executive producer and story by credit. Principal photography and production officially began in November 2017 and ended in June 2019.

Music 
The music for the film is composed by Tom Howe. It was initially believed Ilan Eshkeri, who composed the music for Shaun the Sheep Movie, would return, but these rumors were false.

The theme tune for the film is titled "Lazy" and is written by Justin Hayward-Young, Yoann Intonti, Timothy Lanham, Freddie Cowan, Arni Hjorvar Arnason and Cole Marsden Greif-Neill and performed by The Vaccines and Kylie Minogue. Furthermore, like the previous film, the film incorporates a remix of the series theme tune "Life's a Treat". Both Mark Thomas and Vic Reeves return to perform the remix and are joined by Nadia Rose.

Release
A Shaun the Sheep Movie: Farmageddon was first released in Germany on 26 September 2019 and in the UK on 18 October 2019. It was intended to be theatrically released in the US on 13 December 2019 by Lionsgate, but due to the box office failure of Early Man, the film was acquired by Netflix, who released it digitally on 14 February 2020.

Home media 
In the United States, it was released on Blu-ray and DVD on 18 October 2022 by Shout! Factory. In the United Kingdom, the film was released on Ultra HD Blu-ray and Blu-ray by Studio Canal.

Marketing
In January 2018, it was announced that the teaser of the film would play theatrically in front of another Aardman film, Early Man, worldwide, revealing the film's new title and synopsis. On 7 December 2018, Aardman announced through on social media that the teaser trailer for the film along with release dates would be arriving the following week. The teaser trailer was released online on 11 December 2018, followed by the first official trailer released on 1 April 2019. On 3 July 2019 the second trailer was released.

Reception

Box office
As of 29 December 2019, A Shaun the Sheep Movie: Farmageddon has made $43.1 million against a $25 million budget, with the top-grossing country being UK ($9.2 million), Germany ($6.7 million) and France ($5.4 million). It currently ranks as the 16th highest-grossing stop-motion animated film  of all time.

Critical response 
The critical consensus reads, "A Shaun the Sheep Movie: Farmageddon retains the charm of its small-screen source material while engagingly expanding the title character's world." On Metacritic, the film has a score of 79 out of 100, based on 17 critics, indicating "generally favorable reviews".

Guy Lodge of Variety, who reviewed the previous film, gave the film a positive review, saying, "The great pleasure of these films' bright, largely wordless slapstick is that it plays universally whilst accommodating all manner of obsessive, idiosyncratic detailing at the edges."

Kenneth Turan of the Los Angeles Times  who also reviewed the previous film, gave the film a positive review, saying "That all these characters and then some have distinct personalities is all the more remarkable because no one uses actual words, instead making do quite nicely with assorted grunts, groans and indefinable grumbles."

Brian Tallerico of RogerEbert.com gave 3.5/4 stars to the movie, saying "If you like anything Aardman, or anything funny really, you should make an effort to find it."

Carlos Aguilar of The Wrap gave the film a positive review, saying, "A quick-witted and uproarious homage to the sci-fi genre like only the stop-motion geniuses at Aardman Animations could imagine and handcraft."

Awards and nominations

Video game
A related videogame, entitled Home Sheep Home: Farmageddon Party Edition was released on Nintendo Switch and Steam in October 2019. It was released in Japan in August 2020 by Greenlight Games. In the game, Shaun, Shirley, and Timmy find their way back to the green grass of home, all hosted by Lu-La. The puzzle-platform game reused much of the gameplay from previous Home Sheep Home games.

References

External links
 
 
 A Shaun the Sheep Movie: Farmageddon at Rotten Tomatoes
 A Shaun the Sheep Movie: Farmageddon at Box Office Mojo

Animated films without speech
2010s adventure films
2010s children's comedy films
2010s science fiction films
2019 fantasy films
2019 animated films
2019 films
StudioCanal films
Aardman Animations films
2010s adventure comedy films
Animated adventure films
Animated buddy films
Animated comedy films
Animated films about dogs
Animated films about extraterrestrial life
Animated films based on animated series
Animated space adventure films
British adventure comedy films
British animated fantasy films
British animated science fiction films
British buddy films
British children's animated films
British children's comedy films
British children's fantasy films
British fantasy films
British independent films
Clay animation films
2010s English-language films
2010s fantasy comedy films
Films about amnesia
Films about animal rights
Films about sheep
Films set on farms
2010s stop-motion animated films
Shaun the Sheep films
2010s buddy films
2019 comedy films
StudioCanal animated films
2010s French films
2010s British films
French animated films
2010s French animated films